Each winner of the 1971 Governor General's Awards for Literary Merit was selected by a panel of judges administered by the Canada Council for the Arts.

Winners

English Language
Fiction: Mordecai Richler, St. Urbain's Horseman.
Poetry or Drama: John Glassco, Selected Poems.
Non-Fiction: Pierre Berton, The Last Spike.

French Language
Fiction: Gérard Bessette, Le cycle.
Poetry or Drama: Paul-Marie Lapointe, Le réel absolu.
Non-Fiction: Gérald Fortin, La fin d'une règine.

Governor General's Awards
Governor Generals Awards, 1971
1971 literary awards